Grand Mal was an American rock band, formed by Bill Whitten in New York City in 1995 and has recorded for No.6 Records, Slash/London Records, Arena Rock Recording Co., New York Night Train and Groover Recordings.

Members
Bill Whitten-guitar, vocals, keyboards 1995–2010
Tom Goss - drums 1995-1997
Phil Schuster-bass 1995-1997
John Devries-lead guitar 1995-1999
J Bryan Bowden-drums 1997-1998
Steve Borgerding-bass, lead guitar 1997-2003
Parker Kindred-drums 1998-2010
Jonathan Toubin-keyboards, bass 1998-2004
Michael Gerner-bass 1999-2002
Aaron Romanello-lead guitar 2003-2004
Chris Isom-lead guitar 2003-2006
Nate Brown-keyboards 2003-2005
Dave Sherman-keyboards 2004-2010
Steven Mertens-bass 2004-2006
Mark Ephraim-lead guitar 2004-2005
Sara Press-bass 2004-2005
Mike Fadem-drums 2006-2009
Kevin Thaxton-bass 2006-2009
Justin Russo-keyboards 2004-2005
Jason Russo-guitars 2003–2010
Mike Robertson-lead guitar 2006-2009
Jeff Bailey-bass 2006-2009

Discography

EP’s
Grand Mal (No. 6) 1996

Full-Length
Pleasure Is No Fun (CD/LP) (No. 6) 1997
Maledictions (CD) (Slash/London) 1999
Bad Timing (CD) (Arena Rock) 2003
Love Is The Best Con in Town (New York Night Train) 2006
Congratulations You’ve Re-joined the Human Race (Groover Recordings) 2007
Clandestine Songs (Groover Recordings) TBR April 7, 2010

Tracks Appear On
“Stay in Bed” Jawbreaker (film): Music from the Motion Picture (London) 1999
“Hey Man” This is Next Year: A Brooklyn-Based Compilation (Arena Rock) 2001
Jean and Cover: A Compilation (Groover Recordings) 2005
The World Turns all Around Him: A Compilation (Groover Recordings) 2006
50 Minutes: A Compilation (Exercise1 Recordings) 2006

References

External links
 Myspace: Grand Mal
 Blogspot: Clandestine Band
 [ All Music Guide: Grand Mal]

Musical groups established in 1995
Alternative rock groups from New York (state)
Indie rock musical groups from New York (state)
Musical groups from New York City